Kunst may refer to:

Kunst (surname), a surname
Kunst (album), a 2013 album by industrial music band KMFDM
Art, a word for art in the Estonian, Danish, Dutch, German, and Norwegian languages

See also

Heimkveld Kunst, an ambient music group
VOF de Kunst, a Dutch pop group
Bunch of Kunst, a documentary about the musical group Sleaford Mods